Kushkak or Koshkak, also rendered as Kushgak, may refer to:

Afghanistan
 Kushkak, Afghanistan

Iran
Kushkak, Alborz
Kushkak, Abadeh, Fars Province
Kushkak, Neyriz, Fars Province
Kushkak, Sepidan, Fars Province
Kushkak, Shiraz, Fars Province
Kushkak, alternate name of Ramjerd, Fars Province, Iran
Kushkak, Khuzestan
Kushkak-e Kushk, Khuzestan Province
Kushkak, Kohgiluyeh and Boyer-Ahmad
Kushkak, Ashtian, Markazi Province
Kushkak, Zarandieh, Markazi Province
Kushkak, Mazandaran
Kushkak, Qazvin
Kushkak, Takestan, Qazvin Province
Kashkak, Razavi Khorasan
Koshkak, Razavi Khorasan
Kushkak, Razavi Khorasan
Kushkak, alternate name of Kushk, Nishapur, Razavi Khorasan Province
Kushkak, South Khorasan
Kushkak, Tehran
Kushkak, Rey, Tehran Province

See also
Kashkak (disambiguation)
Kushk (disambiguation)